Gil Young-Tae  is a Gangwon FC footballer from South Korea

Listed on the K-League winter transfers list, it said that he went out from Pohang Steelers FC to Gangwon FC.

References 

Gangwon FC players
South Korean footballers
Pohang Steelers players
K League 1 players
K League 2 players
Living people
1991 births

Association football central defenders